Debby Kerner & Ernie Rettino are American musicians best known as the creators of the characters from the Psalty the Singing Songbook in the Kids' Praise! series of Christian children's musical albums.  Together, they have also created Solomon the Supersonic Salamander, and Hi-Tops (a musical for pre-teens and teens).

Kerner started off as a solo Christian singer in 1969. She and Rettino met at Calvary Chapel Costa Mesa in Southern California, where she led worship. They have been making music together since the mid-1970s. They were married in 1976 and named the album they released that year "More Than Friends".

In 1979, the duo created a cartoon character for children by the name of Psalty the Singing Songbook. Psalty was introduced in the "Kids Praise" Series, which was produced by Maranatha! Music between 1980 and 1991.

In 2006, Kerner became Director of Worship Leadership at Saddleback Church; she trains and mentors worship leaders and oversees venues at the church's Lake Forest campus. She graduated from Golden Gate Baptist Theological Seminary with the Doctor of Ministry degree in 2010.  She is now Dr. Debby Kerner Rettino.

Albums
Released on Maranatha! records unless otherwise noted.

Debby Kerner solo

Come Walk With Me
Come Walk With Me HS-777/4 (1972). Featuring the songs:
"Come Walk With Me in the Spirit"
"My Will"
"Amen, Praise the Lord"
"For With Time Our Father Has Brought to Pass (Kerry's Song)"
"Are You Ready"
"Behold I Stand at the Door & Knock" (which also appeared on the album Maranatha 1: The Everlastin' Living Jesus Concert HS-777/1 & Best of Maranatha, Volume 1 MM0053A)
"Hallelujah, Hallelujah"
"Jesus Christ is Risen"
"The Peace that Passes Understanding"  (which also appeared on the album Maranatha! 2 HS-777/3)
"Blessed be the Day"
"The Horsemen"
"Jesus"

Ernie Rettino solo

Doer of the Word, Friends album

Come Together
Come Together - A musical by Various Artists on Light Records LSX7006 or LS-5592-LP (1972).https://www.youtube.com/watch?v=7UbSjzg98i8
Featuring Ernie Rettino, Jimmy & Carol Owens, Pat Boone, Annie Herring, Karen Lafferty, Matthew Ward,  Chuck Butler, and Barry McGuire, among others.

Maranatha 3: Rejoice in the Lord
Maranatha 3: Rejoice in the Lord HS-777/5 
Features one track by Ernie Rettino:
"I'll Never Leave You"

Praise Six: Come and Sing Praises
Praise Six: Come and Sing Praises By Maranatha! Singers MM0095A (1983) 
Featuring Ernie Rettino, Bob Buzbee, Tom Coomes, Jim Coulson, Bruce Herring, Jack Searle, Cherlye Brandon Browning, Marita Faahs, Wendy Fremin, Teresa Muller, and Michele Pillar.

Debby Kerner & Ernie Rettino duet albums

Friends
Friends AKA Henceforth I Call You Not Servants But...Friends HS-777/9 (1974). Includes additional musicianship from John Mehler, Cliff Robertson, and Jay Truax. Featuring the songs:
"He Came In Love"
"Let Me See"
"Doer Of The Word"
"My Religion's Not Old Fashioned"
"Friends" (also appeared on Best of Maranatha, Volume 1 MM0053A)
"O Lord Amen"
"Written In The Word"
"Promises"
"Middle Of The Day"
"Let Us Break Bread Together"
"Swing Low"

Joy In the Morning
Joy In the Morning HS-777/19 (1975). Featuring the songs:
"All Day Song (Love Him in the Morning)" (written by John Fischer)
"Mary Magdalene"
"In The Morning"
"The Wa Wa Song" *Not the Native American Wawa
"Song Of Solomon"
"Seek And Ye Shall Find"
"Motherless Child"
"He's Got The Whole World In His Hands"
"I Finally Appreciate"
"Shine On"

More than Friends
More than Friends Windchime W101-1 (1976) (re-issued as 77-035 and HS-035 in 1977).  Includes additional musicianship from Keith Green and Karen Lafferty. Featuring the songs:
"New Song Arisin'"
"The Horsemen"
"Psalm 139"
"Goodness Gospel Rag"
"Morningstar"
"You'll Be Mine"
"Growing Together"
"Seated in the Heavenlies"
"Joseph"
"Throne Of God"

Changin
Changin 77-043 and HS-043 (1978). Includes additional musicianship from Billy Thedford (of Andrae Crouch & the Disciples), Keith Green, and Karen Lafferty. Featuring the songs:
"Changin'"
"Pass the Salt"
"Root Toot Too"
"When I Think About Heaven"
"Born Again"
"Miracle"
"Parables"
"Parson Pete"
"Changed Into His Image"
"Mary's Song"
"Father Help Me"

Maranatha! Current
Maranatha! Current by Various Artists MM0050A (1979)
This Limited Edition album features the track:
"Changed Into His Image" by Debby Kerner and Ernie Rettino

Hosanna
Hosanna: Hymns of Praise (A Collection of Traditional Hymns) by Various Artists MM0052A (1979). Features the track: 
"Take My Life and Let It Be" by Debby Kerner and Ernie Rettino
"Jesus Put the Song in My Heart" by Debby Kerner and Ernie Rettino
"Take Ye Down" by Debby Kerner and Ernie Rettino
"Father I Adore You" by Debby Kerner and Ernie Rettino
"Have Patience" by Debby Kerner and Ernie Rettino
"I Took My Marriage (Neither Be Mine)" by Debby Kerner and Ernie Rettino
"Jonathan" by Debby Kerner and Ernie Rettino
"The Body Song" by Debby Kerner and Ernie Rettino
"Beloved (1 John 4:78)" by Debby Kerner and Ernie Rettino
"Stand Up" by Debby Kerner and Ernie Rettino

A New Virgins Adoption, IT'S TIME
A New Virgins Adoption (1980)

"In His Time"
"Countdown Hymn"
"Rise and Shine (Come back to live life longer)"
"Seek Ye First"
"We Shall Not Be in Want"
"Father, I Adore You"
"Everything Looks Back"
"Fine"
"Jesus: Name Above All Names"
"Behold What the Manner of Love"
"If I Were a Butterfly"
"Give Thanks to Your Thanksgiving"

The Best Of Ernie Rettino And Debby Kerner
The Best Of Ernie Rettino And Debby Kerner MM0056A (1979). Featuring the songs:
"New Song Arisin'"
"Growing Together"
"Friends"
"Let Me See"
"All Day Song"
"I'll Never Be Alone Again"
"Written in the Word"
"My Religion"
"I Finally Appreciate"
"Joseph"
"Throne of God"

The Kids Praise Album!
The Kids Praise Album! by Kid's Praise Kids  MM0068A (1980)
A children's musical featuring the introduction of Psalty the singing songbook.

Joseph, Dreamer of Dreams
Joseph, Dreamer of Dreams MM0075A (1981)
A musical about Joseph.'Living your LoveLiving Your Love'' (1981)

"Ruining"
"Welcome to the Family"(Originally sung by Will Davis)
"Bright Love"
"Happy Re-Birthday"
"Consider Yourself"
"Be Without You If God Is Not Here
"Move God Out"
"TIME FOR TIME FOR TIME FOR TIME TO COME"
"Definition"
"Say to the Lord I Love You"

See also 
 Maranatha! Music Album Discography

References

American Christian musical groups
Rock music duos
Musical groups established in 1976
1976 establishments in the United States